Edward Saddler (date of birth unknown, died 28 October 1874) was an Australian cricketer. He played three first-class matches for New South Wales between 1855/56 and 1861/62.

See also
 List of New South Wales representative cricketers

References

External links
 

Year of birth missing
1874 deaths
Australian cricketers
New South Wales cricketers
Place of birth missing